The Capitole train bombing was the bombing of a Le Capitole train on the Paris-Toulouse express near Limoges on 28 March 1982. The attack killed five people and injured 28 others. The bombing was claimed by a group calling itself "International Terrorist Friends of Carlos", and was later attributed to Venezuelan terrorist Carlos the Jackal. In 2011 Carlos was convicted for the bombing whilst he was already serving life imprisonment. The attack was followed with the bombing of an anti-Syrian newspaper office in Paris in April.

See also
Terrorism in France
List of terrorist incidents in France
TGV train and Marseille station bombings

References

 
1982 murders in France
Crime in Nouvelle-Aquitaine
Improvised explosive device bombings in 1982
Improvised explosive device bombings in France
March 1982 crimes
March 1982 events in Europe
Mass murder in 1982
Terrorist incidents in France in 1982
Train bombings in Europe
Railway accidents and incidents in France
20th-century mass murder in France